Adventure in Warsaw is a 1938 German-Polish comedy film directed by Carl Boese and starring Georg Alexander, Paul Klinger and Jadwiga Kenda. The film was the second of two German-Polish co-productions following Augustus the Strong (1936).

A separate Polish version A Diplomatic Wife was released.

Cast
Georg Alexander as Exzellenz Bernardo de Rossi - Gesandter in Warschau
Paul Klinger as Henry de Fontana - Gesandtschaftsrat
Jadwiga Kenda as Jadwiga Janowska - seine Frau
Hedda Björnson as Ines Costello - eine junge Witwe
Baby Gray as Wanda - eine angehende Soubrette
Robert Dorsay as Jan - Operettenbuffo
Richard Romanowsky as Stanislaus Bilinski - Theaterdirektor
Rudolf Carl as Kupka - sein Sekretär
Mieczysława Ćwiklińska as Apollonia, komische Alte
Eugen Wolff as Mit seinen Tanzorchester

References

Bibliography

External links 

1938 films
Films of Nazi Germany
German comedy films
Polish comedy films
German black-and-white films
Polish black-and-white films
1938 comedy films
1930s German-language films
Films directed by Carl Boese
Films set in Warsaw
German multilingual films
Tobis Film films
Polish multilingual films
1938 multilingual films
1930s German films